The grass skink, grass-top skink, or long-tailed skink  (Trachylepis megalura) is a species of skink found in Africa.

References

Trachylepis
Reptiles described in 1878
Taxa named by Wilhelm Peters